Elk (formerly Greenwood and Elk River) is an unincorporated community in Mendocino County, California.

Geography

Elk has a population of 208. It is located on the coast at the crossroads of State Route 1 and Philo-Greenwood Road.  Albion, Little River, and Mendocino lie to the north, and Manchester and Point Arena to the south.  Inland are Navarro, Philo, and Boonville.

History 

Elk was originally called "Greenwood," after the Greenwood brothers, early homesteaders and sons of mountain man Caleb Greenwood and his half-Crow wife, one of the rescuers of the Donner Party. When the post office was opened, in 1887, there was already another Greenwood in California so it was called Elk Post Office. Eventually the name came to refer to the town. When pioneer lumberman Lorenzo White was unable to reach a satisfactory deal with the owners of the lumber chutes at Cuffy's Cove to ship out his redwood product, he constructed a wharf out along a string of rocks in the center of what is now Elk. When he built a large steam sawmill and  gauge railroad, the new employment drained the town of Cuffy's Cove, which was eventually abandoned. The sawmill was producing  of lumber per day by 1890. The mill was sold to Goodyear Redwood Company in 1916. Elk River Company took over the sawmill when Goodyear went bankrupt in 1932. The local redwood lumber industry economy collapsed when the uninsured sawmill burned in 1936.

A new sawmill was built in about 1953 and another followed in 1963.  These operated until the late 1960s, when the redwood and Douglas fir was mostly logged out.  After some quiet times, the town has had a rebirth as a recreation destination.  Many of the larger old houses are now bed and breakfast inns, and the state has acquired Greenwood State Beach and the original mill site as a state park. 
The ZIP Code is 95432. The community is inside area code 707.

Elk Logging Railway locomotives

Government

References

External links

 Elk, CA Travel Information

Populated coastal places in California
Unincorporated communities in California
Unincorporated communities in Mendocino County, California
Defunct California railroads
Logging railroads in the United States
1887 establishments in California